Cerithiopsis aimen is a species of very small sea snail, a marine gastropod mollusk in the family Cerithiopsidae. This species was described by Emilio Rolán and José Espinosa in 1996.

Description 
The maximum recorded shell length is 3.2 mm.

Habitat 
Minimum recorded depth is 23 m. Maximum recorded depth is 42 m.

References

aimen
Gastropods described in 1996